Desiderii Marginis is a dark ambient music project from Sweden.

History 
Desiderii Marginis was formed by Johan Levin in 1993 in Mjölby, Sweden as a solo project.
The first three tapes Consecrare, Via Peregrinus and Triptych were originally released in very limited editions, however in 2009 these tracks were released on the retrospective album Years Lend a Golden Charm. Some of these songs appeared in new versions on Songs Over Ruins, the debut album released on Cold Meat Industry in 1997.

Albums 
 Songs Over Ruins. Cold Meat Industry, 1997
 Deadbeat. Cold Meat Industry, 2001
 Strife. Cold Meat Industry, 2004
 The Ever Green Tree. Kaosthetik Distribution, 2005
 That Which Is Tragic and Timeless. Cold Meat Industry, 2005
 Seven Sorrows. Cold Meat Industry, 2007
 Years Lend a Golden Charm. (Compilation) Eternal Pride, 2009
 Procession. Cyclic Law, 2012
 Hypnosis. Cyclic Law, 2014
 Thaw. Zoharum, 2014
 Vita Arkivet. Cyclic law, 2018
 Departed.  Cyclic law, 2020

See also 
 List of dark ambient artists
List of ambient music artists

Dark ambient music groups
Swedish musical groups